Rikers Island is a  island in the East River in the Bronx that contains New York City's largest jail.

The first stages of expansion were accomplished largely by convict labor hauling in ashes for landfill. The island is politically part of the Bronx, although bridge access is from Queens. It is part of Queens Community Board 1 and uses an East Elmhurst, Queens, ZIP Code of 11370 for mail.

The island is the site of one of the world's largest correctional institutions and mental institutions, and has been described as New York's best-known jail. The complex, operated by the New York City Department of Correction, has a budget of $860 million a year, a staff of 9,000 civilian officers and 1,500 other civilians managing 100,000 admissions per year and an average daily population of 10,000 inmates . The majority (85%) of detainees are pretrial defendants, either held on bail or remanded in custody. The rest of the population have been convicted and are serving short sentences. According to a 2021 analysis by New York City Comptroller, it costs the city approximately $556,539 to detain one person for one year at Rikers Island.

Rikers Island has a reputation for violence, both abuse and neglect of inmates, attracting increased press and judicial scrutiny that has resulted in numerous rulings against the New York City government, and numerous assaults by inmates on uniformed officers and other civilian staff, often resulting in serious injuries. In May 2013, Rikers Island ranked as one of the ten worst correctional facilities in the United States, based on reporting in Mother Jones magazine. A documented increase in violence on Rikers Island was reported by the 2010s. In 2015, there were 9,424 assaults, the highest number in five years. In October 2019, the New York City Council voted to close down the facility by 2026.

Complex and facilities
The Rikers Island complex, which consists of ten jails, holds local offenders who are awaiting trial, serving sentences of one year or less, or are temporarily placed there pending transfer to another facility. Rikers Island is therefore not a prison by US terminology, which typically holds offenders serving longer-term sentences. It holds 10 of the New York City Department of Correction's 15 facilities and can accommodate up to 15,000 detainees.

Facilities located on the island include Otis Bantum Correctional Center (OBCC), Robert N. Davoren Complex (RNDC, formerly ARDC), Anna M. Kross Center (AMKC), George Motchan Detention Center (GMDC), North Infirmary Command (NIC), Rose M. Singer Center (RMSC), Eric M. Taylor Center (EMTC, formerly CIFM), James A. Thomas Center (JATC) (no longer used to house inmates), George R. Vierno Center (GRVC) West Facility (WF), Harold A. Wildstein (no longer in use), and Walter B. Keane (no longer in use). The Bantum, Kross, Motchan, and Vierno facilities house detained male adults. Taylor houses sentenced male adolescents and adults. Davoren primarily houses male inmates who are of ages 18 through 21. Singer houses detained and sentenced female adolescents and adults. North Infirmary primarily houses inmates who require medical attention from an infirmary. West Facility houses inmates who have diseases that are contagious. The average daily inmate population on the island is about 10,000, although it can hold a maximum of 15,000. The daytime population (including prisoners, staff, and visitors) can be as high as 20,000.

The only road access to the island is from Queens, over the  three-lane Francis Buono Bridge, dedicated on November 22, 1966, by Mayor John Lindsay. The street address is 15 Hazen St. E.Elmhurst, NY 11370.  Before the bridge was constructed, the only access to the island was by ferry. Transportation is also provided by the  MTA Regional Bus Operations route. In addition, privately operated shuttles connect the parking lot at the south end to the island. Bus service within the island for visitors visiting inmates is provided by the New York City Department of Correction on Fridays, Saturdays, and Sundays.

The North Infirmary Command, which used to be called the Rikers Island Infirmary, is used to house inmates requiring extreme protective custody, inmates with special health needs, mentally ill inmates, and inmates undergoing drug detoxification. The Infirmary also has the capacity to house overflow inmates from conventional populations. The rest of the facilities, all built in the last 67 years, make up this city of jails, in addition to the Vernon C. Bain Correctional Center, a floating barge (described below), as well as schools, medical clinics, ball fields, chapels, gyms, drug rehab programs, grocery stores, barbershops, a bakery, a laundromat, a power plant, a track, a tailor shop, a print shop, a bus depot, and a car wash. It also contains a large composting facility.

Rikers Island has been referred to as the world's largest penal colony.

History

Historic use
The island is named after Abraham Rycken, a Dutch settler who moved to Long Island in 1638 and took possession of the island in 1664. Rycken's descendants, the Ricker family, owned Rikers Island until 1884, when it was sold to the city for $180,000.

The island was used as a military training ground during the Civil War. The first regiment to use the Island was the 9th New York Infantry, also known as Hawkins' Zouaves, which arrived there on May 15, 1861. Hawkins' Zouaves was followed by the 36th New York State Volunteers on June 23, which was followed by the Anderson Zouaves on July 15, 1861. The Anderson Zouaves were commanded by John Lafayette Riker who was related to the owners of the island. The camp of the Anderson Zouaves was named Camp Astor in compliment to millionaire John Jacob Astor Jr. who provided funding for the army, and who appears to have made a significant contribution to the raising of the Anderson Zouaves in particular, with the Astor ladies being credited with the manufacture of the zouave uniforms worn by the recruits of this regiment. Rikers Island was subsequently used by numerous other Civil War regiments, but the name "Camp Astor" was specific to the Anderson Zouaves and did not become a general name for the military encampment on the island.

In 1883, New York City's Commission of Charities and Corrections expressed an interest in purchasing the island for use as a work-house. Any such purchase would have to be approved by the state. In January 1884, state senator Frederick S. Gibbs introduced a bill in the state senate authorizing the commission to purchase the island. In May 1884 Governor Grover Cleveland signed a bill authorizing the Commissioner of Charities and Corrections to purchase the island for a sum no greater than $180,000. At the time, the island was within the boundaries of Long Island City, which was located in Queens County, which was not yet part of New York City, and this potential transfer set off squabbling between politicians of Long Island City, Queens County, and New York City. On July 31, 1884, a compromise was agreed to by all three entities, New York City agreed to pay a total of $3,000, to be disbursed as $2,500 to Long Island City and $500 to Queens County. On August 4, 1884, the Commissioner of Charities and Corrections, Jacob Hess, signed a contract purchasing the island from John T. Wilson, a descendant of the Ryker family, for $180,000: $179,000 to Wilson and $1,000 for a title search.

Conversion to jail
The city expressed a desire to open a jail for men on Rikers Island as early as 1925, in order to replace their overburdened and dilapidated jail on Welfare Island, now Roosevelt Island; the jail was opened in 1932. This required the permission of the federal government, since the expansion extended the island's pier line. Also,  were stripped from Rikers to help fill in the new North Beach Airport, which opened in 1939 and was later renamed LaGuardia Airport.

The net expansion of the island enabled the jail facilities to also expand. The original penitentiary building, completed in 1935, was called HDM or the House of Detention for Men; it became a maximum security facility called the James A. Thomas Center and closed due to structural issues in 2000.

After New York City was banned by the courts in 1922 from ocean dumping of garbage, much of it ended up on Rikers Island, even though the island already had 12 mountains of garbage 40 to 130 feet tall; still, it took in 1.5 million cubic yards of additional refuse, more than the amount of dirt displaced by the building of the World Trade Center. Since much of the garbage was composed of ash from coal heating and incinerators, there were frequent spontaneous phosphorescent fires, even in the wintertime, in the snow. One warden described it in 1934: "At night it is like a forest of Christmas trees – first one little light ... then another, until the whole hillside is lit up with little fires. ... It was beautiful." The island was also plagued with rats, which at one point were so prevalent that after "poison gas, poison bait, ferocious dogs and pigs" failed to control them, one New Yorker tried to organize a hunting party to kill them off. It was the efforts of "master builder" Robert Moses, who did not want the unsightly island to be the backdrop for his carefully landscaped 1939 World's Fair, to get the island cleaned up, and have the city's garbage sent elsewhere—ultimately to the Fresh Kills Landfill on Staten Island.

During Mayor David Dinkins' term as mayor of New York, the jail filled to overflowing, and an 800-bed barge was installed on the East River to accommodate the extra inmates. The barge is called the Vernon C. Bain Correctional Center (VCBC), and is also known simply as "The Boat". VCBC is located at 1 Halleck St, Bronx, NY 10474, at the end of Hunts Point, near the Fulton Fish Market. The keel for the Vernon C. Bain was laid in 1989 at the Avondale Shipyard in New Orleans. Upon completion, VCBC was towed up from Louisiana to its current mooring, and attached to two "Crandall Arms". It opened for use as a facility in 1992. Originally it had been leased to the NYC Department of Juvenile Justice, while Spofford Juvenile Center was under reconstruction. VCBC was formerly known as Maritime Facility #3 (MTF3); facilities 1 and 2 were reconstructed British military transport barges, or BIBBYs (British Industries Boat Building Yard), used during the Falklands War, both of which could house 800 soldiers, but only 200 inmates after their conversion. MTFs 1 and 2 were anchored on either side of Manhattan at East River pier 17, near 20th street, in the Hudson River. In addition, there were two smaller 1950s-era Staten Island Ferry boats, both converted to house 162 inmates each. The ferry boats were sold for salvage around 2003, and the owner of the shipyard that built VCBC, Avondale Shipyard, bought the two BIBBYs. VCBC is the only vessel of its type in the world. Prior to modification for use by New York City, it cost $161 million to construct. The initial plan for acquiring the vessel, because of the way New York City makes capital purchases, had to begin at least five years before the keel was laid, during the tenure of Ed Koch.

Notable events
Rikers is close to the runways of LaGuardia Airport. On February 1, 1957, Northeast Airlines Flight 823 crashed onto Rikers Island shortly after departing LaGuardia Airport, killing 20 and injuring 78 out of a total of 95 passengers and 6 crew. After the crash, department personnel and inmates ran to the site to help survivors. As a result of their actions, of the 57 inmates who assisted with the rescue effort, 30 were released and 16 received a sentence reduction of six months by the N.Y.C. Parole Board. Governor Averell Harriman also granted commutation of sentence to 11 men serving definite sentences: two received a six-months' reduction; one workhouse and eight penitentiary definites became eligible for immediate release.

In 1993, United Blood Nation was founded by Omar Portee  and Leonard McKenzie while locked up in the George Mochen Detention Center at Rikers Island.

A drawing by artist Salvador Dalí, done as an apology because he was unable to attend a talk about art for the prisoners at Rikers Island, hung in the inmate dining room in J.A.T.C. (HDM) from 1965 to 1981, when it was moved to the prison lobby in E.M.T.C. (C76) for safekeeping. The drawing was stolen in March 2003 and replaced with a fake. Three correctional officers and an assistant deputy warden were arrested and charged, and though the three later pleaded guilty and one was acquitted, the drawing has not been recovered.

During the AIDS crisis in the 1980s and 1990s, at the request of the Association for Drug Abuse Prevention and Treatment (ADAPT) and the Executive Director Yolanda Serrano, the prison granted early release to terminal HIV-positive inmates so that they could die peacefully in their own homes.

The prison housed juvenile inmates until 2018. The move was prompted by a law passed by New York state in 2017 requiring that juvenile inmates under 18 be housed separately from adults.

Proposed closure of jail complex
In February 2016, the Independent Commission on New York City Criminal Justice and Incarceration Reform, also known as the Lippman Commission since it is chaired by former Chief Judge of the State of New York Jonathan Lippman, was convened by New York City Council Speaker Melissa Mark-Viverito to review the entirety of the city's criminal justice system. In April of that year, Glenn E. Martin  launched a campaign that called for the closure of the Rikers Island Jail Complex. In September 2016, the campaign organized a march from Queens Plaza to the Rikers Island Bridge to send a message to former Mayor Bill de Blasio that New York City is united in demanding the jail complex be closed.

In the months following, there had been plans to build an additional facility on the island that consisted of 1,500 beds. In November 2016, New York City Department of Correction Commissioner Joseph Ponte said, "As we look at construction and now with the...kind of the movement to close Rikers all those things politically have to be taken into consideration. So the 1,500 bed facility on Rikers is still at...at a kind of pause right now".

After a year of consideration, the Lippmann Commission released a report of recommendations for closing the jail complex. De Blasio did not specifically endorse the findings of the commission, and it is expected to provide the broad outline of the plan to close Rikers when it was announced. The Lippman Commission proposed a 10-year plan to close the ten jails currently on the island and replace them with smaller jails, one in each borough closer to the courthouses. The population at Rikers Island would have to decrease from current average of 10,000 to approximately 5,000. According to The Mayor's Office of Criminal Justice, key strategies in shrinking the Rikers population has included addressing causes of case delays, identifying individuals that could be granted alternatives to jail time, and improving programming and discharge services. Since 1991, the Rikers population has dropped by more than 50%, when the average daily population was 21,688. The intention to close the prison complex within 10 years was endorsed by former Mayor Bill de Blasio on March 31, after the New York Post leaked the findings of the Lippman Commission.

One possible reuse proposal was to build a low-rise residential development, although the island's distance from mass transit, proximity to LaGuardia Airport, and leakage of toxic methane gas from its landfill base would pose problems for the proposed development. It would also mean that each residential unit would cost about twice as much to construct as a normal unit in New York City. The residential development would connect the island to the mainland for the expansion of the airport, using it as a park, for solid-waste management or for manufacturing. However, the commission specifically ruled out its use for private residences. In light of possible closure of the jail complex, New York City Public Advocate Letitia James suggested renaming the island after Kalief Browder, an inmate who committed suicide after being jailed at Rikers.

On June 22, 2017, former Mayor de Blasio released his plan for a 10-year shutdown of the facility, saying that it was not a "quick fix": "This will be a long a difficult path," he wrote. The city will reduce the inmate population of Rikers through the use of alternative facilities and reforms such as making the payment of bail easier and improving mental health facilities and programs. Two "diversion centers" will assist people with mental health problems and will work with police to find options other than incarceration.  Smaller jail facilities will be open throughout the city, but the plan does not fully describe how, where, and when that will occur.

The New York State Commission of Correction, which oversees New York City's jails, issued a report in February 2018 citing numerous violations in the facility on the part of the city and a significant increase in violent incidents from 2016 to 2017. It suggested that the state might move to close Rikers Island before the city's 10-year deadline, which is not legally binding. On October 17, 2019, the City Council voted for an over $8 billion plan to close the Rikers Island prisons and other New York City jails by 2026, and replace them with four borough-based jails. New prisons are planned, but council members said that a move from arrests to tickets, not prosecuting misdemeanors, and a state law set to eliminate cash bail for misdemeanors would reduce the need for jails.

Abuse and neglect of prisoners
Rikers Island has become notorious in recent years for a "culture of abuse", and has been subject to a number of investigations and rulings.

Rulings related to strip searches
In 1986, a federal appeals court ruled that strip searches could not be performed on people arrested on misdemeanor charges, like fare evasion on the subway, or marijuana smoking. The case itself was brought by Ann Weber, who was arrested for making an inflated claim on a 911 call, after her son was attacked while leaving her daughter's wedding. She was brought to jail still dressed in formal wedding attire, locked in a cell, and forced to strip and expose her cavities for search in the hour it took for her daughter to arrive and post bail.

Prior to this decision, all prisoners taken to Rikers, no matter the level of their accusation, were strip searched. These searches often took place in groups of 10 to 12 and involved genital and anal searches. Despite the court's ruling, the practice lived on, costing New York City taxpayers a total of $81 million in settlements to the victims of these illegal searches. In 2001, a ruling was reached in New York reinforcing the illegality of strip searches for misdemeanor detainees, and demanding that the city pay up to $50 million to the tens of thousands of people who were illegally searched over the years.

However, the practice did not die. Another suit was filed against the city in 2007 for performing strip searches on inmates taken to Rikers on misdemeanor charges. On October 4, 2007, the New York City Department of Corrections conceded that tens of thousands of nonviolent inmates taken to Rikers Island on misdemeanor charges had been wrongly strip-searched in violation of a 2002 court settlement, and were entitled to payment for damages. The policy was kept in place despite a United States Court of Appeals for the Second Circuit ruling in 2001 that strip-searches of misdemeanor suspects were illegal, unless officials suspected that they were carrying contraband..." [Lead lawyer Richard D.] Emery charged in his papers that department officials "repeatedly resorted to lying to cover up deliberate indifference to the continued practice of humiliating detainees by forcing them to strip naked in groups." This class action suit won $33 million in damages.

Inmates as enforcers
In February 2008, correctional officer Lloyd Nicholson was indicted after he allegedly used a select group of teenage inmates as enforcers under a regime called "the program", as well as allegedly beating inmates himself. However, "the program" has been known to exist for well over a decade and is unique to the adolescents. The inmates use it as a test for other inmates and a system of control amongst themselves.

A Village Voice article lists a roll call of 2008 scandals at Rikers, including the case of officers who allegedly passed accused cop killer Lee Woods marijuana, cigarettes, and alcohol; the February indictment of correctional officer Lloyd Nicholson who used inmates as "enforcers", and the April 27 suicide of 18-year-old Steven Morales (who allegedly killed his infant daughter) in the high-security closed-custody unit.

On February 4, 2009, The New York Times reported that "the pattern of cases suggests that city correctional officials have been aware of a problem in which Rikers guards have acquiesced or encouraged violence among inmates." The Times added that "There have been at least seven lawsuits filed in Federal District Court in Manhattan accusing guards of complicity or acquiescence in inmate violence at Rikers, a complex of 10 detention facilities which, along with several other jails around the city, hold about 13,000 prisoners, most of whom are pretrial detainees. None of the seven suits has gone to trial. In the three that were settled, the city admitted no liability or wrongdoing."

Sexual assault
In an alleged July 2008 rape case reported by The Village Voice on August 5, 2008, the alleged victim claimed "that someone entered her cell in the 1,000-bed Rose M. Singer Center while she was asleep, sometime before 6 a.m. on July 3. She says the intruder (or intruders) bound and gagged her with bedsheets and then used a dildo-like object to sexually assault her. Other inmates may have acted as lookouts during the alleged assault. The woman, who was being held on grand-larceny charges for the past three months, was discovered at about 6 a.m. by an officer and a captain who were touring the building. The officer saw her lying on her back on the floor of her cell with bedsheets wrapped around her neck, mouth, and legs. She had also been blindfolded. The incident was reported to central command at 7:30 a.m., and the woman was transported to the Elmhurst Hospital Center. Because she didn't share a cell with anyone, a major question is how the alleged assault happened in the first place. Officials won't talk about the investigation, and there's no word on whether any arrests have been made."

Officer brutality
On June 1, 2007, Captain Sherman Graham and Assistant Deputy Warden Gail Lewis were arrested by the New York City Department of Investigation (DOI) for covering up an assault on an inmate. The arrest came after both were indicted by a Bronx grand jury. It is alleged that on October 4, 2006, Graham assaulted an inmate after he refused to comply with strip searching procedures at the Robert N. Davoren Center (RNDC, C-74). The assault occurred in front of 15 correctional academy recruits in training. After the assault, Graham ordered the recruits to write on their Use of Force Witness Reports that Graham assaulted the inmate in self-defense after the inmate punched Graham. Lewis, who was Graham's supervisor, did not intervene to stop the attack. Lewis also submitted a false Use of Force Witness Report. Charges against Graham include 16 counts of falsifying business records, 16 counts of offering a false instrument for filing in the first degree, 16 counts of official misconduct, a class A misdemeanor and one count of attempted assault in the third degree. Lewis was charged with falsifying business records, offering a false instrument for filing and official misconduct. The investigation started when the DOI received a tip following an anti-corruption presentation at the Academy in October 2006 on the day before graduation.

Graham and Lewis were found guilty on all charges by a Bronx jury on May 14, 2012. It took the jury approximately three hours to deliberate a guilty verdict. Lewis was able to retire in December 2009 with her pension. Graham was terminated from the Department of Correction following the guilty verdict. Each faced up to four years in prison, however, Graham and Lewis were both sentenced to 500 hours of community service and ordered to pay $1,000.00 in fines on August 7, 2012, when they were sentenced.

Solitary confinement
The New York City Department of Correction reported that in fiscal year 2012 more than 14.4 percent of adolescents detained at Rikers Island between the ages of 16 and 18 were held in at least one period of solitary confinement while detained. The average length of time young people spent in solitary confinement at Rikers Island was 43 days. More than 48 percent of adolescents at this institution have diagnosed mental health problems.

On August 28, 2014, a law was passed boosting oversight of the use of solitary confinement at Rikers Island, following intense public outcry after various abuses at the prison. The law requires the prison to publish quarterly reports on their use of solitary confinement, but did not include provisions regarding the protection of prisoners against guard brutality or limiting the use of solitary confinement as a punishment.

The solitary confinement unit at Rikers is commonly referred to as "Bing", the inmates kept there known as "Bing monsters".

Kalief Browder
Kalief Browder was accused of stealing a backpack at the age of 16. His family was unable to make his $3,000 bail, later being unable to post bail due to a probation violation. Browder was imprisoned without trial or conviction for three years, his trial postponed on numerous occasions. The case was eventually dismissed, and Browder was released in June 2013 by Judge Patricia DiMango after numerous postponements and 31 hearings in front of judges. For two of those years, Browder was held in solitary confinement or punitive segregation. He was profiled in The New Yorker in October 2014 for being held for three years on Rikers Island without a trial.

In June 2015, Browder died by suicide by hanging. The conditions of his detention were widely seen as having caused his mental condition. He had multiple prior suicide attempts while incarcerated. Days after his death, U.S. Supreme Court Justice Anthony Kennedy invoked Browder's experience in his opinion on Davis v. Ayala. On January 25, 2016, President Barack Obama wrote an article in The Washington Post criticizing the "overuse" of solitary confinement in American jails, basing his arguments largely on Browder's case. He signed an executive order banning solitary confinement of juveniles in federal prisons.

Treatment of mentally ill
Since 2014, Mayor de Blasio has begun to take action against the abuse by adding surveillance cameras and improving care for mentally ill prisoners.

On September 29, 2014, Judge Tynia Richard offered a sharp rebuke to the Department of Corrections, recommending that six correctional officers be fired. This group, led by Captain Budnarine Behari, had participated in the brutal beating of Robert Hinton, a mentally ill inmate, while he was hog-tied, because he had protested being moved from his cell by sitting down.  Hinton's fellow inmates watched as he was dragged down the hallways while hog-tied to a solitary confinement cell where he was beaten. While this ruling was one of the most severe against the Department of Corrections in many years, almost two years had elapsed between the beating and the Justice Department's ruling, during which time the perpetrators in this attack were involved in more inmate beatings at Rikers Island.

Treatment of LGBT inmates
The segregated unit at Rikers for LGBT prisoners, known as "gay housing," was closed in December 2005 citing a need to improve security. The unit had opened in the 1970s due to concerns about abuse of LGBT prisoners in pretrial detention. The New York City Department of Correction's widely criticized plan was to restructure the classification of prisoners and create a new protective custody system which would include 23-hour-per-day lockdown (identical to that mandated for disciplinary reasons) for moving vulnerable inmates to other facilities. Whereas formerly all that was required was a declaration of homosexuality or the appearance of being transgender, inmates wanting protective custody would now be required to request it in a special hearing. "In 2015, city corrections officials opened what was then called the Transgender Housing Unit. Many detainees didn’t know about or couldn’t get into the dorm, which could only house a few dozen, but nonetheless it was one of just a handful of such specialized facilities across the country. Three years later, spurred by LGBTQ+ advocates, the mayor’s office announced that the Department of Correction would house incarcerated people consistent with their gender identity."

"Eric Adams, a former NYPD captain, swept into the mayor’s office promising a pro-law enforcement agenda that included supporting the old guard that had long decided how things ran on the island. Adams replaced the reform-minded jails commissioner Vincent Schiraldi with his own pick, Louis Molina, whose administration immediately pushed out top department leaders supportive of the LGBTQ+ unit and shelved a draft policy directive aimed at getting more trans and gender-nonconforming detainees into gender-aligned housing. This institutional reversal has stranded numerous trans and gender-nonconforming detainees in dangerous, male housing units for weeks or months on end, subjecting many to egregious forms of physical and sexual violence, according to dozens of internal emails, Department of Correction records, and interviews with more than 20 people who work or live in city jails, including current and former corrections staffers, incarcerated trans women, jail guards and attorneys."

Federal investigation
In August 2014, the US Attorney for the Southern District of New York, Preet Bharara, issued a report condemning the systematic abuse and violation of prisoners' constitutional rights.  Despite this and many other egregious incidents of abuse, few correctional officers have been prosecuted successfully or even removed from their positions. On August 4, 2014, Preet Bharara, the US Attorney for the Southern District of New York, issued a damning report on the treatment of juvenile prisoners at Rikers. The report identified "a pattern and practice of conduct at Rikers that violates the constitutional rights of adolescent inmates". The report describes the "rampant use of unnecessary and excessive force by DOC staff", as well as dangers to inmates including inadequate protection from violence caused by other inmates, a culture that uses violence as a means to control inmates, and heavy use of solitary confinement ("punitive segregation") for discipline.  The report details the guards' frequent use of violence, including "headshots" (blows to the head or face), particularly in areas without video surveillance.  This violence is perpetrated as punishment or retribution against the inmates, or "In response to inmates' verbal altercations with officers".

COVID-19 crisis
During the COVID-19 pandemic in New York City, inmates at Rikers were unable to follow the safety measures suggested by the Centers for Disease Control and Prevention to avoid contracting the virus. Inmates, correctional officers, the DOT, and the head doctor at Rikers warned that better precautionary measures should be put in place, and that non-violent inmates should be released, making arguments in the name of public health. One inmate said, "The hygiene in here is really nasty. There are roaches and mice in the dorms and rats in the hallway. It’s a good place for disease to hang out. I don’t want to be kept in here for this whole coronavirus thing. I plan to do my whole sentence, that’s fine, but this is just crazy." On March 22, 2020, it was reported that two dorms of 45 inmates each were carrying out a strike in protest of the lack of PPE, social distancing, and cleaning supplies, and demanding the release of all inmates who met the criteria specified by the Board of Correction. In summer 2020, about 2500 inmates were released from Rikers on early COVID Release.  By October 2021, the New York Times reported that as a result of staff shortages exacerbated by the COVID pandemic, inmates were virtually running the jail and lawlessness, violence and chaos reigned.

Inmate deaths

Jason Echevarria 
On August 18, 2012, inmate Jason Echevarria swallowed a packet of powdered detergent, which had been given to inmates to clean out their cells after there was a leakage of raw sewage from the toilets. Echevarria began vomiting and complaining of severe pain. Terrence Pendergrass, the supervisor of the unit, was told by a correctional officer of Echevarria's condition. According to The New York Times, "... the captain told the officer not to bother him unless 'there was a dead body,' the complaint said". Several correctional officers passed through his unit but he received no medical attention and was found dead in his cell the following morning. The medical examiner ruled his death a homicide, citing "neglect and denial of medical care".

Jason Echevarria suffered from bipolar disorder and was housed in the unit reserved for mentally ill inmates. At one point, he had been placed in solitary confinement after several suicide attempts.

Terrence Pendergrass was demoted and suspended without pay, following the incident, and in December 2014, he was convicted of one count of denying Echevarria medical care, resulting in death. In June 2015, Terrence Pendergrass was sentenced to five years in prison. In November 2015, Echevarria's family was awarded a $3.8 million settlement regarding the matter.

Ronald Spear
In 2012, 52-year-old Ronald Spear was awaiting trial on Rikers Island, and due to kidney failure, he was detained in the North Infirmary Command. He walked with a cane and wore a bracelet that read "risk of fall". On December 19, 2012, Spear left his dormitory and demanded to see a doctor.

Brian Coll, a correctional officer, and Ronald Spear got into an altercation when Spear was told by the doctor that he could not be seen until later that day. Coll began punching Spear in the face and body. According to The New York Times, "Another officer grabbed Mr. Spear and with Mr. Taylor's help [Byron Taylor, former correctional officer], pinned him down. The complaint says Mr. Coll kicked Mr. Spear several times in the head, and knelt down, telling him, 'Remember that I'm the one who did this to you'". When a Rikers Island medical team reached Spear, he was unresponsive, and after failed attempts to revive him, he was pronounced dead. An investigation into the incident found that Coll and two other officers conspired to cover up how Spear died.

In 2016, Brian Coll was convicted of one count of death resulting from deprivation of rights under color of law, one count of conspiracy to obstruct justice, one count of obstruction of justice, one count of filing false forms, and one count of conspiracy to file false forms. Byron Taylor pleaded guilty to one count of perjury for lying to a federal grand jury, and one count of conspiracy to obstruct justice. Anthony Torres pleaded guilty to one count of conspiracy to obstruct justice and file false reports, and one count of filing a false report.

Bradley Ballard
Bradley Ballard, who suffered from schizophrenia and diabetes, was sent to Rikers in June 2013 on a parole violation for failure to report an address change. In July, he was sent to the psychiatric prison ward at Bellevue Hospital Center, where he stayed for 38 days before being sent back to Rikers.

On September 4, 2013, Ballard was locked in his cell as punishment for making inappropriate gestures at a female correctional officer. According to The New York Times, "the lawsuit said, 'Not a single nurse, doctor or other medical or mental health provider entered his cell'". On September 11, Ballard died at the age of 39, having been confined inside his cell for seven days without access to his medication or medical treatment. When officers finally came to the aid of Ballard, he was naked, unresponsive, and covered in feces. His genitals were swollen and badly infected due to the result of injuries suffered after he tied a band around his penis.

According to The New York Times, some 129 inmates, 77% of whom were diagnosed as mentally ill, suffered "serious injuries" in altercations with prison guards over an 11-month period in 2013. These injuries were "beyond the capacity" of the prison doctors to treat successfully. Another Times article stated that "the lawsuit said, 'Rather than provide the critical care required' medical staff and correctional officers 'who knew Mr. Ballard could not survive without medication, essentially stood by and watched as Mr. Ballard languished, deteriorated and ultimately died. In 2016, the city agreed to pay $5.75 million to settle the lawsuit.

Jerome Murdough
On February 15, 2014, Jerome Murdough, a homeless veteran in jail on an accusation of trespassing, was found dead in his cell. After being in jail for one week, he died from overexposure to heat. His cell was over 100 degrees, and he had taken prescription drugs which increase sensitivity to heat. Murdough had been complaining for hours about the heat but was ignored by prison guards. Murdough had been arrested for camping out on the stairwell of a New York Housing Authority building during the freezing polar vortex of 2014; his bail was set at $2,500. A settlement of $2.25 million occurred.

Rolando Perez 
In January 2014, Rolando Perez was arrested for petty burglary and awaiting trial at Rikers. Perez suffered from a severe seizure disorder since the age of 16 and had taken medication to control his seizures ever since. Perez was being detained in solitary confinement after getting into a fight with another inmate. In an exclusive video obtained by Eyewitness News, Perez is heard screaming for his medication. After being denied anti-seizure medication, at the age of 36, Perez was found dead due to seizure and heart problems. In 2019, Perez's girlfriend was awarded $3.5 million in a settlement over his death.

Eugene Castelle 
Staten Island native Eugene "Sonny" Castelle was battling an addiction to pain killers when he was arrested in Florida for heroin possession with intent to sell. This arrest was in violation of the terms of a drug-related plea agreement in New York. On November 2, 2016, Castelle was sent to Rikers and was found dead six days later, at the Anna M. Kross Center. An inmate told the Daily News that Castelle had taken a dose of methadone, using another prisoner's prescription when he died. Castelle was vomiting and struggling to stand. Another inmate helped Castelle to 'the bubble' watch post to ask for medical help. The correctional officer inside was sleeping, and angrily dismissed them both, the inmate said. The following morning, Castelle was found by a correctional officer and medical staff unresponsive and was declared dead seven minutes later.

Layleen Xtravaganza Cubilette-Polanco 
Layleen Xtravaganza Cubilette-Polanco was a 27-year-old Afro-Latina transgender woman who died at Rikers Island, New York City's main jail complex, on June 7, 2019, in solitary confinement after staff failed to provide her with medical care that could have saved her life for 47 minutes following an epileptic seizure.  After a six-month investigation, the New York City Department of Investigation (DOI) and Bronx District Attorney Darcel Clark claimed that staff members were not responsible for Polanco's death. Records indicate that officers had extensive knowledge of Polanco's epilepsy, having already suffered multiple seizures at Rikers.

A video of the incident revealed that multiple staff members knocked on Polanco's cell door and that she was unresponsive. In the presence of her unresponsive body, officers could be seen laughing. The DOI stated that officers thought Polanco was napping and that the laughter was unrelated.  A wrongful death lawsuit was filed by David Shanies, the attorney for the Polanco family.  Polanco's death reignited conversations about banning cash bail and pretrial detention. Melania Brown, Polanco's sister, and many others called for banning solitary confinement in New York City after Polanco's death. Polanco was the tenth black trans woman to die in 2019.

2021 deaths

Conditions on Rikers Island have drastically deteriorated since the onset of COVID-19, due to a combination of viral outbreaks, staffing shortages, and exacerbated mental health crises among detainees. There were 15 reported deaths of incarcerated people on Rikers Island in 2021: William Diaz-Guzman, age 30, Tomas Carlo Camacho, age 48, Javier Valasco, age 37, Thomas Earl Braunson III, age 35, Richard Blake, age 45, Jose Mejia Martinez, age 34, Robert Jackson, age 42, Brandon Rodriguez, age 25, Segundo Guallpa, age 58, Esias Johnson, age 24, Isa Abdul-Karim, age 41, Stephan Khadu, age 24, Victor Mercado, age 64, Malcolm Boatwright, age 28, and William Brown, age 55. Chief Medical Officer Ross McDonald attributed recent deaths to worsening conditions of the jail since the outbreak of COVID-19, calling the situation representative of a "new and worsening emergency".

In popular culture

The vast majority of criminals in the Marvel Universe are sent to "Ryker's Island", a prison with special facilities for superpowered individuals on an island near New York that was clearly based on Rikers Island.  The name difference perhaps comes from an alternate corruption of the Dutch spelling of the original family name as "Rycken" or "de Rycke" that became Riker in the "real world".
Rikers Island was a prominent setting for many scenes of the long-running crime drama Law & Order and its spin-offs.
Corruption and prisoner abuse at Rikers Island was the basis of the 2015 crime novel Pannino is Dead by Marc Zirogiannis, which was based on actual experiences from 2009.
In series two of the medical drama New Amsterdam, the main characters attend Rikers and attempt to treat female prisoners, many experiencing period poverty and related illnesses, such as toxic shock syndrome.
 The Night Of is a 2016 American crime drama miniseries for HBO. The main character, Naz, becomes an inmate at Rikers Island, where he experiences violence and corruption.
 In Tom Clancy's The Division, one of the several factions is named the “Rikers” after convicts which have escaped from Rikers Island during a chaos-causing pandemic.
 In Pop Smoke’s song “Dior”, he raps about Rikers Island and how he takes over prison blocks when he is incarcerated. “If I'm on the island, I'm snatchin' the cell. Brody got locked, denied his bail. Until he free, I'm raisin' hell”.
 In the 2022 miniseries Inventing Anna, journalist Vivian Kent is seen in nearly every episode visiting Anna "Delvey" Sorokin in the Rose M. Singer Center (RMSC) on Rikers Island.
 In the HBO series Euphoria, characters Fezco and Cal Jacobs are placed in jail, but since the series is set in California, the production will cover up within New York City, as part of the third season.

See also

 Bronx court system delays
 List of jail facilities in New York City
Men's Central Jail (Los Angeles)
Twin Towers Correctional Facility (Los Angeles)
Cook County Jail (Chicago)
Harris County, Texas jails (Houston)

References

Bibliography
 Venters, Homer (2019) Life and Death in Rikers Island. Baltimore, Maryland: Johns Hopkins University Press.

External links

 Jennifer Gonnerman, "Before the Law", The New Yorker, October 6, 2014, pp. 26–32.
 CRIPA Investigation of the New York City Department of Correction Jails on Rikers Island, August 4, 2014 Published by the New York Times
 Department Of Justice Takes Legal Action To Address Pattern And Practice Of Excessive Force And Violence At Rikers Island Jails That Violates The Constitutional Rights Of Young Male Inmates (December 18, 2014). published by the U.S. Department of Justice
  (Part 2 here)

1932 establishments in New York City
Government buildings in the Bronx
Islands of New York City
Islands of Queens, New York
Islands of the Bronx
Islands of the East River
Jails in New York City
Law enforcement in the New York metropolitan area
New York (state) in the American Civil War
Prison islands
Prisons in New York City
 
New York City Department of Correction